The 2009 Valencia Superbike World Championship round was the third round of the 2009 Superbike World Championship season. It took place on the weekend of April 3–5, 2009 at the Circuit de Valencia in Valencia, Spain.

Results

Superbike race 1

Superbike race 2

Supersport race

References
 Superbike Race 1
 Superbike Race 2
 Supersport Race

External links
 The official website of the Circuit de Valencia
 The official website of the Superbike World Championship

Valencia
Valencia Superbike World Championship round
Superbike World Championship round